The Spite Bride is a 1919 American silent drama film directed by Charles Giblyn and starring Olive Thomas, Robert Ellis and Jack Mulhall.

Cast
 Olive Thomas as Tessa Doyle
 Robert Ellis as 	Billy Swayne
 Jack Mulhall as 	Rodney Dolson
 Claire Du Brey as Trixie Dennis
 Irene Rich as 	Eileen Moore
 Dorothy Wallace as 	Millicent Lee
 Lamar Johnstone as 	Arthur Derford 
 Katherine Griffith as 	Countess di Raspoli
 Molly Malone as Vaudevillian

References

Bibliography
 Connelly, Robert B. The Silents: Silent Feature Films, 1910-36, Volume 40, Issue 2. December Press, 1998.
 Munden, Kenneth White. The American Film Institute Catalog of Motion Pictures Produced in the United States, Part 1. University of California Press, 1997.

External links
 

1919 films
1919 drama films
1910s English-language films
American silent feature films
Silent American drama films
American black-and-white films
Films directed by Charles Giblyn
Selznick Pictures films
1910s American films